Hugues Bernard Charles Lepic (born c. 1965) is a private equity professional and investor who is the founder and chief executive officer of Aleph Capital Partners. He previously spent 22 years with Goldman Sachs.

Education
Lepic holds an M.Sc. from the École Polytechnique in France and an MBA from the Wharton School of the University of Pennsylvania.

Career
Lepic is the founder and chief executive officer of Aleph Capital Partners. He founded Aleph in 2013 after 22 years as a private equity professional with Goldman Sachs in New York. He was a partner there for 12 years.

Appointments
Lepic has been a director of Eutelsat Communications SA, Prysmian Spa, Groupe Eurotunnel SA, Iliad SA, Neuf Cegetel SA, PagesJaunes Groupe, and Technicolor SA.

Property dispute
In 2004, Lepic bought a home in Cheyne Walk in London and acquired the freehold of an adjacent property with a sitting tenant at the same time. In 2015, a dispute between Lepic and his tenants reached the courts in London when Lepic successfully argued that he was entitled to possession of the house.

References 

French chief executives
Living people
Goldman Sachs people
Wharton School of the University of Pennsylvania alumni
École Polytechnique alumni
French bankers
Year of birth uncertain
Year of birth missing (living people)